This is a list of chess historians.

Chess historians

Yuri Averbakh
Henry Bird
Ricardo Calvo (October 22, 1943 – September 26, 2002)
Hiram Cox
G. H. Diggle
David Vincent Hooper
Willard Fiske
Professor Duncan Forbes
Jeremy Gaige
Ann Gunter
Tim Harding (chess player)
H. F. W. Holt
Thomas Hyde (29 June 1636 – 18 February 1703)
Sir William Jones (September 28, 1746 – April 27, 1794)
Garry Kasparov
Baron von der Lasa
David H. Li
Antonius van der Linde
A. A. Macdonell
H. J. R. Murray (June 24, 1868 – May 16, 1955)
Joseph Needham
A. v. Oefele
M. E. V. Savenkof
F. Strohmeyer
Olimpiu G. Urcan
Bo Utas
John Griswold White
Ken Whyld (6 March 1926 – 11 July 2003)
William Henry Wilkinson
Edward Winter

Notes

External links
Initiative Group Königstein
 Edward Winter's Chess History Column

History of chess
Historians